Ksar Mosque or Jemaâ Al Ksar, also of the Hanafi rite, is a mosque in Tunis, Tunisia.

History
Located in front of Dar Hussein (Bab Menara), it was built in the early 12th century. It was a royal mosque,  probably built during the reign of Ahmed Ibn Kourassane (1100–1128).

Around 1598, it was attached to the Hanafi by the Turkish conquerors.

Structure

The mosque has had a lot of building work and renovation. The minaret was rebuilt in 1647/48, and decorated with marble and terra cotta glazed in a Moorish style, and its eastern facade is decorated with big bows and horseshoes in the Fatimid style.

Access to the mosque is through a door under a covered walkway that opens into a courtyard elevated above the prayer hall. It is surrounded by a portico with columns and capitals such as Turkish Prayer Hall which is topped by arches supported by ancient columns and capitals. At the back of the hall, the mihrab, of remarkable size, is semicircular with seven niches separated by pilasters. It is surmounted by a Fatimid style fluted half-dome.

References

Bibliography 
 Mohamed Masmoudi et Jamila Binous, Tunis. La ville et les monuments, Tunis, Cérès Productions, 1980, p. 80–81

Mosques in the medina of Tunis
12th-century mosques
Religious buildings and structures completed in 1648